Norma Lochlenah Davis (10 April 1905 – 5 November 1945) was an Australian poet.

Born in Glenora, Tasmania, Davis began publishing poetry in the Australian Woman's Mirror under an array of pseudonyms. She later moved to the village of Perth, Tasmania, and lived in a house that is now the Jolly Farmer Inn. Davis contributed poetry to Australian literary magazines such as Meanjin, The Bulletin, Poetry and Jindyworobak. It was only in the early 1940s, shortly before her death, that Davis concentrated fully on writing. She published two collections, Earth Cry (1943) and I, the Thief (1944).

Davis died of cancer at her home, Glenarvon, Perth on 5 November 1945. Her remains were privately cremated.

References

1905 births
1945 deaths
Australian women poets
Writers from Tasmania
Deaths from cancer in Tasmania
20th-century Australian women writers
20th-century Australian poets